Love Hope Faith is the sixth studio album by American country rap artist Colt Ford. Released on May 5, 2017, the work was published through Average Joes Entertainment.

Content
As with Ford's previous albums, the album features multiple guest artists. Among those featured on this album are Brad Paisley, Toby Keith, Lit, Charles Kelley (of Lady Antebellum), and The Voice winner Javier Colon. The album also features Ford singing on several tracks instead of rapping.

Critical reception
A review from Roughstock writer Matt Bjorke was positive, praising the variety of guest vocalists and the tracks on which Ford sings, such as "4 Lane Gone" and "Dirt Road Disco". He added that "the good times and good vibes found throughout Love Hope Faith will certainly appease longtime fans and newcomers alike."

Commercial performance
The album debuted at No. 7 on the Top Country Albums chart, and No. 64 on Billboard 200, selling 9,600 copies in the first week. It sold a further 2,600 copies in the second week, making a total of 12,200 sold. It has sold 22,600 as of September 2017.

Track listing

Charts

References 

2017 albums
Colt Ford albums
Average Joes Entertainment albums